Vitamin is a South Korean variety show, which airs on KBS2, KBS's cable and satellite network for comedy and variety shows. The show was hosted by Kim Tae-hoon and Lee Hwi-jae. The show ended its run on March 9, 2017 after 14 years.

Format
The show relies on a variety program format and aims to contribute to the development and improvement of the quality of lives of citizens by providing valuable information along with entertainment. The show discusses recent and relevant topics such as aging prevention, sex, the truth about Adam and Eve, and the birth cycle. Through a trilogy, or even a tetralogy, the program attempts to approach these topics profoundly and systematically, with a new point of view and satisfy viewer's curiosities. There are panels of medical experts and guests who talk about the set topic with the hosts and learn new ways to be healthy.

Former hosts

Timeline

List of episodes

2003

2004

2005

2006

2007

2008

2009

2010

2011

2012

2013

2014

2015

2016

2017

See also

References

External links 
  
 

Television series by SM C&C
Korean-language television shows
2003 South Korean television series debuts
2017 South Korean television series endings
2000s South Korean television series
2010s South Korean television series